Steve Weston (1940 – May 12, 1985) was a Canadian television and theatre actor. He is best known to Canadian audiences from his stint as the husband in the sitcom The Trouble With Tracy, and as a series regular on the sketch comedy series Bizarre. However, he was also an accomplished stage actor and once played the role of Gooper Pollitt in a Toronto production of Cat on a Hot Tin Roof. Also appeared on the short lived CBLT TV (Toronto Comedy) Sunday Morning with a cast that included Rosemary Radcliffe.

Weston's death was the result of a fall from a roof. He had been suffering from a pancreatic disorder that caused him to experience hallucinations.

References

External links
 

1940 births
1985 deaths
Canadian male film actors
Canadian male television actors
Canadian male stage actors
Accidental deaths from falls
20th-century Canadian male actors